In mathematics, especially in the area of algebra known as group theory, a complement of a subgroup H in a group G is a subgroup K of G such that 

Equivalently, every element of G has a unique expression as a product hk where h ∈ H and k ∈ K. This relation is symmetrical: if K is a complement of H, then H is a complement of K. Neither H nor K need be a normal subgroup of G.

Properties
 Complements need not exist, and if they do they need not be unique. That is, H could have two distinct complements K1 and K2 in G.
 If there are several complements of a normal subgroup, then they are necessarily isomorphic to each other and to the quotient group.
 If K is a complement of H in G then K forms both a left and right transversal of H. That is, the elements of K form a complete set of representatives of both the left and right cosets of H.
 The Schur–Zassenhaus theorem guarantees the existence of complements of normal Hall subgroups of finite groups.

Relation to other products
Complements generalize both the direct product (where the subgroups H and K are normal in G), and the semidirect product (where one of H or K is normal in G).  The product corresponding to a general complement is called the internal Zappa–Szép product.  When H and K are nontrivial, complement subgroups factor a group into smaller pieces.

Existence
As previously mentioned, complements need not exist.

A p-complement is a complement to a Sylow p-subgroup.  Theorems of Frobenius and Thompson describe when a group has a normal p-complement.  Philip Hall characterized finite soluble groups amongst finite groups as those with p-complements for every prime p; these p-complements are used to form what is called a Sylow system.

A Frobenius complement is a special type of complement in a Frobenius group.

A complemented group is one where every subgroup has a complement.

See also
 Product of group subsets

References

Group theory